James Traill Calder (1794–1864) was a Scottish local historian who was the author of a History of Caithness.

Life
Born in Castletown, Caithness, Calder studied at the University of Edinburgh. After working as a private tutor for the Rev. Mr. Gunn at Caithness, Calder became the parish teacher at Canisbay.

Calder died at Elwick Bank, Shapinsay, Orkney, on 15 January 1864.

Works

Calder's major work,Sketch of the Civil and Traditional History of Caithness from the Tenth Century, was published in 1861. According to the Oxford Dictionary of National Biography, it "remains a standard work".

In 1842 Calder published at Wick Sketches from John o' Groat's in Prose and Verse, which contained a chapter on "Ancient Superstitions and Customs in Caithness". In 1846, he published a volume of poems, The Soldier's Bride.

Notes

Attribution

1794 births
1864 deaths
Scottish antiquarians
People from Caithness